Sybra minutissima is a species of beetle in the family Cerambycidae. It was described by Breuning in 1943.

References

minutissima
Beetles described in 1943